Simferopol Raion is one of the 25 regions of the Crimean peninsula, administered by Russia, but considered by many countries as part of Ukraine. The administrative center of the raion is the city of Simferopol which is incorporated as a town of republican significance and is not a part of the district. The Simferopol Raion is situated in the central part of the peninsula. Population:

Demographics 
According to the 2001 All-Ukrainian Census the population of the region was 149,253 persons. The population showed the following ethnic groups:
 Russians - 49.4%
 Ukrainians - 23.5%
 Crimean Tatars - 22.2%
 Belarusians — 1.4%
 Poles - 0.2%
 Moldovans — 0.2%

Population as of May 1, 2012 was 157,589.

References 

Raions of Crimea